Pedraza may refer to:

Places
 Pedraza, Magdalena, Colombia
 Pedraza, Segovia, Spain
 Pedraza de Campos, Palencia, Spain
 Pedraza de Alba, Salamanca, Spain
 Pedraza Municipality, Barinas, Venezuela

People
 Ángel Pedraza (1962–2011), Spanish footballer
 José Pedraza (disambiguation)
 Marc Pedraza (born 1987), Spanish footballer
 María Pedraza (born 1996), Spanish actress and social media star
 Manuela Pedraza (fl. 1806), Argentine fighter in the reconquest of Buenos Aires
 Manuel Gómez Pedraza (1789–1851), Mexican general and President of Mexico from 1832 to 1833
 Pilar Pedraza (born 1951), Spanish academic and writer
 Rod Pedraza (born 1969), American baseball player
 Walter Pedraza (born 1981), Colombian cyclist
 Wilfredo Pedraza, Peruvian lawyer and politician